Karl-Heinz Narjes (30 January 1924 in Soltau – 26 January 2015 in Bonn) was a German Christian Democratic (CDU) politician. From 1969 to 1973 he was Minister for Economy and Transport of the State of Schleswig-Holstein and from 1981 to 1988 he was a European Commissioner.

During World War II, Narjes was a soldier in Kriegsmarine serving on a submarine U-91 with the rank of Leutnant zur See. After the submarine was sunk by the British Navy on 26 February 1944 eastwards of the Azores, Narjes became a prisoner of war of Britain.

From 1971 to January 1973, Narjes was a member of the Landtag of Schleswig-Holstein, i.e. the state parliament. From 1972 to 1981, he was a member of the Bundestag.

In the 1981–1985 Thorn Commission, Narjes was Commissioner for Parliamentary Relations and for Competition

In the 1985–1988 Delors Commission, he was a Vice-President of the Commission and Commission for Industry, information technology and science and research.

References 

|-

|-

1924 births
2015 deaths
Ministers of the Schleswig-Holstein State Government
Members of the Landtag of Schleswig-Holstein
Members of the Bundestag for Schleswig-Holstein
German European Commissioners
European Commissioners 1981–1985
European Commissioners 1985–1988
People from Heidekreis
Kriegsmarine personnel
German prisoners of war in World War II held by the United Kingdom
Members of the Bundestag for the Christian Democratic Union of Germany